Anna is a 1967 French musical-comedy film directed by Pierre Koralnik and starring Anna Karina.

Cast
 Anna Karina as Anna
 Jean-Claude Brialy as Serge (as J.C. Brialy)
 Marianne Faithfull as a young woman at the evening dance 
 Serge Gainsbourg as Serge's friend
 Barbara Sommers as an aunt of Serge's
 Isabelle Felder as an aunt of Serge's
 Henri Virlojeux as banker
 Hubert Deschamps as TV host

References

External links

1967 films
1967 musical comedy films
French musical comedy films
French television films
1960s French-language films
Films directed by Pierre Koralnik
Films with screenplays by Jean-Loup Dabadie
Films scored by Serge Gainsbourg
1960s French films